Chloroclystis taraxichroma is a moth in the family Geometridae. It is found on Bali.

References

External links

Moths described in 1958
taraxichroma